Krystyn Lach Szyrma (17 December 1790, Wojnasy; 21 April 1866, Devonport, Devon) was a professor of philosophy at Warsaw University. He was also a writer, journalist, translator and political activist.

Life
Szyrma was professor of philosophy at Warsaw University from 1824 to 1831. He left no philosophical writings.

Szyrma was one of nearly all the university professors of philosophy in Poland before the November 1830–31 Uprising who held a position that shunned both Positivism and metaphysical speculation, affined to the Scottish philosophers but linked in certain respects to Kantian critique.

See also
History of philosophy in Poland
List of Poles
W. S. Lach-Szyrma

Notes

References
Władysław Tatarkiewicz, Zarys dziejów filozofii w Polsce (A Brief History of Philosophy in Poland), [in the series:] Historia nauki polskiej w monografiach (History of Polish Learning in Monographs), [volume] XXXII, Kraków, Polska Akademia Umiejętności (Polish Academy of Learning), 1948. This monograph draws from pertinent sections in earlier editions of the author's Historia filozofii (History of Philosophy).
Krystyn Lach-Szyrma, From Charlotte Square to Fingal’s Cave: Reminiscences of a Journey through Scotland, 1820–1824, edited and annotated by Mona Kedslie McLeod, East Lothian, Tuckwell Press, 2004, 244 pp., illus., SB, £20.00.

1790 births
1866 deaths
19th-century Polish philosophers
19th-century translators